Saša Drakulić (Serbian Cyrillic: Саша Дракулић; born 28 August 1972) is a retired Serbian footballer. The striker went to South Korea in 1995 and during his nine seasons in the K League made a name for himself as one of the most successful foreign players ever in the league.

Career
Drakulić joined Red Star Belgrade in 1993.

In Asia
In 1995, he joined the Korean side Busan Daewoo Royals, scoring eight goals the first season. He played for the Busan Daewoo Royals until July 1998, when he made the switch to Suwon Samsung Bluewings. With the Bluewings he won two consecutive K-League Championships in 1998 and 1999, before making an ill-fated switch to J. League Division 1 side Kashiwa Reysol.

He spent a short unhappy period in Japan before returning to Suwon in May 2000, He was returned Suwon Samsung Bluewings as loan trade with Hwang Sun-hong in May 2000.

In 2011, he was on the move again, joining Seongnam Ilhwa Chunma. Drakulić won three Championship medals from 2001–2003 with the Chunma before departing the K-League and signing for Cypriot side AEK Larnaca.

During his nine seasons in K League, Drakulić scored 104 goals in his 271 matches (Regular season and League Cup, at the time the second-highest scoring tally in the history of the league. He holds the record for the most shots on goal with 941 strikes.

Return
In 2005, he moved back to the First League of Serbia and Montenegro with Vojvodina, but subsequently moved on to second division side ČSK Čelarevo at the start of 2006. After ČSK, Drakulić joined Mladost Apatin in July 2006.

After a successful year with Mladost, Drakulić moved back to Vojvodina in the summer of 2007, and made an appearance in the UEFA Cup tie against Hibernians FC. His Vojvodina contract was cancelled in December 2007 after he picked up a cruciate knee injury whilst playing in an indoor football tournament without the permission of his club.

Honours

Club
Busan Daewoo Royals
 K League : 1997
 League Cup : 1997-Adidas Cup, 1997-Prospecs Cup
Suwon Samsung Bluewings
 K League : 1998, 1999
 League Cup : 1999-Adidas Cup, 1999-Daehan Fire Insurance Cup
 Super Cup : 1999
Seongnam Ilhaw Chunma
 K League : 2001, 2002, 2003
 League Cup : 2002-Adidas Cup

Individual
 K League Top Scorer : 1999
 K League Best XI : 1998, 1999

Club statistics

Stats in K League
 Other competitive competitions, including the Korean Super Cup, Asian Super Cup, A3 Champions Cup, Peace Cup.

Stats in J1 League

References

External links

 
 Profile at Srbijafudbal

1972 births
Living people
Sportspeople from Vinkovci
Serbs of Croatia
Serbian footballers
Association football forwards
Red Star Belgrade footballers
Busan IPark players
Suwon Samsung Bluewings players
Kashiwa Reysol players
Seongnam FC players
AEK Larnaca FC players
FK Vojvodina players
FK ČSK Čelarevo players
FK Mladost Apatin players
FK Proleter Novi Sad players
FK Cement Beočin players
FK Brodarac players
K League 1 players
J1 League players
Serbian SuperLiga players
Cypriot First Division players
Serbian expatriate footballers
Expatriate footballers in South Korea
Expatriate footballers in Japan
Expatriate footballers in Cyprus
Serbian expatriate sportspeople in South Korea